The 2006 Michigan Secretary of State election was held on Tuesday, November 7, 2006 to elect the Michigan Secretary of State for a four-year term. Incumbent Republican Terri Lynn Land ran for re-election to a second term.

Candidates

Republican Party
Incumbent Terri Lynn Land won the party's nomination during the state convention.

Democratic Party
Macomb County Clerk Carmella Sabaugh won the party's nomination during the state convention.

Results

References

External links

2006 Michigan elections
Michigan Secretary of State elections
Michigan
November 2006 events in the United States